Egremont railway station was built by the Whitehaven, Cleator and Egremont Railway as the first southern terminus of what would become the  to  branch. In 1878 the company was bought out by the LNWR and Furness Railway who operated the line jointly until grouping in 1923.

The station was towards the northern end of the town, in Cumbria, England.

History
The line was one of the fruits of the rapid industrialisation of West Cumberland in the second half of the nineteenth century, opening to passengers on 1 July 1857.

This enabled traffic from the Cleator Moor and Rowrah areas, especially iron ore, to move much more readily southwards.

Services
A Saturdays Only evening train terminated at Moor Row. The southbound service was similar. There were no Sunday trains.

The LNWR and Furness Joint Railway divided traffic responsibilities so that passenger traffic through the station was usually worked by the Furness Railway.

It is not yet clear when this came to an end or if other services were provided.

Goods traffic was typical of an industrial area, sustaining sidings and goods depots long after passenger services were withdrawn.

In 1946, the Milk Marketing Board opened a dairy on the eastern side of the goods yard. The dairy had a siding where milk tanks were filled and was worked by its own diesel shunter. These tanks were worked to Carlisle and then south down the West Coast Mainline to London.

Mineral traffic was the dominant flow, though this was subject to considerable fluctuation with trade cycles. A considerable amount of iron ore travelled south through and from Egremont bound for the furnaces of Millom and Barrow-in-Furness.

Stations and signalling along the line south of Rowrah were changed during the Joint regime to conform to Furness Railway standards.

Rundown and closure
The station closed on 7 January 1935 when normal passenger traffic ended along the line.

Life flickered briefly in Spring 1940 when workmen's trains were reinstated to support a period of high activity building the Royal Ordnance Factory at Drigg, but that lasted less than a month.

A public Sellafield-Egremont-Moor Row-Whitehaven service was reinstated on 6 May 1946, only to be "suspended" on 16 June 1947, a victim of the post-war fuel crisis. Bradshaw still listed the service as Suspended in 1949. It was never reinstated.

Workmen's trains to Sellafield ended on 6 September 1965.

Initially this comprised eight steam-hauled carriages, ending typically formed of a pair of Derby Lightweight 2-car units. Sources differ on when this service ended:- 3 March 1969 or 11 December 1969.

Iron Ore from Beckermet Mines continued to pass through the station site until 1980, after which the line was closed and lifted.

Afterlife
By 2013 satellite images appeared to show that the route through Egremont was a sliver of Public Open Space. The route of the line south of Egremont through to the junction with the Cumbrian Coast Line can be traced on satellite images with some ease, forming the western boundary of the village of Thornhill, passing to the west of the centre of the village of Beckermet and curving to join the coast line between the bridge over the River Ehen and Sellafield Station.

See also

 Furness Railway
 Cleator and Workington Junction Railway
 Whitehaven, Cleator and Egremont Railway

References

Sources

Further reading

External links
Map of the line with photos, via RAILSCOT
The station as the line's southern terminus on an 1867 OS map, via National Library of Scotland
The station on overlain OS maps surveyed from 1898, via National Library of Scotland
The station on a 1948 OS Map, via npe maps
The railways of Cumbria, via Cumbrian Railways Association
Photos of Cumbrian railways, via Cumbrian Railways Association
The railways of Cumbria, via Railways_of_Cumbria
Cumbrian Industrial History, via Cumbria Industrial History Society
The line's and station's Engineer's Line References, via railwaycodes.org.uk
Furness Railtour using many West Cumberland lines 5 September 1954, via sixbellsjunction
A video tour-de-force of the region's closed lines, via cumbriafilmarchive
Haematite, via earthminerals

Disused railway stations in Cumbria
Beeching closures in England
Railway stations in Great Britain opened in 1857
Railway stations in Great Britain closed in 1947
1857 establishments in England
Egremont, Cumbria